Duello nel Texas, also known as Gunfight at Red Sands and Gringo, is a 1963 Italian/Spanish international co-production directed by Ricardo Blasco and Mario Caiano, and produced by Albert Band as his first Spaghetti Western. It was also the first Western to feature a score by Ennio Morricone and the second Spaghetti Western to star Richard Harrison.

Plot
Outside of Carterville, Texas, the sheepherding Martinez family has discovered gold on their land.  Manuel, the wayward youngest son boasts about the fact under the influence of alcohol in a saloon. The next day three masked men ride to the Martinez house, where they murder the father, wound Manuel and steal the gold belonging to the family.  Unaware of the crimes they committed, the three masked riders are seen by Richard Martinez, called "Gringo" who is an adopted Anglo-American son of the Martinez family.  Gringo has been away for four years fighting with guerillas against the Mexican Government.  Discovering the tragedies, Gringo seeks the help of Sheriff Lance Corbett to find the killers who Gringo can only identify by their horses.  Gringo kills one of the men who attempts to ambush him and gradually discovers that certain people in the town of Carterville want to obtain the land of the Martinez family for themselves.

Cast

Notes

External links

1963 films
1960s Italian-language films
Spaghetti Western films
Italian Western (genre) films
Spanish Western (genre) films
1963 Western (genre) films
Films directed by Mario Caiano
Films scored by Ennio Morricone
Films shot in Almería
1960s Italian films